Zawady  is a village in the administrative district of Gmina Rawa Mazowiecka within Rawa County, Łódź Voivodeship, in central Poland.

References

Zawady